Rocket To Nowhere is an EP by Huevos Rancheros. It was first released as a 7" in 1991 on Estrus Records in 3 colours:

1st pressing: 500 purple vinyl
2nd pressing: 500 burgundy vinyl
3rd pressing: 1000 black vinyl

It was subsequently released on cassette in 1992, with the addition of two songs.

Track listing
All songs by Brent J. Cooper, Graham Evans, and Richie Lazarowich, except where noted.

7" version

Side 1
 Endsville
 Ace O' Spades (Cooper/Wray)

Side 2
 Please Pass The Ketchup
 Rocket To Nowhere

Cassette version

Side A
 Endsville
 Ace O' Spades (Cooper/Wray)
 The Short Happy Song

Side B
 Please Pass The Ketchup
 Rocket To Nowhere
 Rumble (Cooper/Wray)

References                 

1991 EPs
Huevos Rancheros (band) albums